Tağcılar is a Turkish word meaning "oilers". (In slang it may mean "flatterers".) It may refer to;

People with the surname
 Mahir Yağcılar (born 1961), Turkish Kosovar politician

Places
 Yağcılar, Aydın, a village in Central district of Aydın Province, Turkey
 Yağcılar, Çanakkale
 Yağcılar, Çine, a village in Çine district of Aydın Province, Turkey
 Yağcılar, Kargı
 Yağcılar, Yığılca
 Yağcılar, Yusufeli, a village in Yusufeli district of Artvin Province, Turkey

See also
 Yağcılar (disambiguation)

Turkish-language surnames